Joondalup United Football Club is an Australian semi-professional soccer club based in the northern suburbs of Perth, with grounds at Forrest Park in Padbury, Prince Regent Park in Heathridge, Charonia Reserve in Mullaloo, and Beldon Park in Beldon. They currently compete in the Football West State League Division 1 and use Forrest Park as their home ground for their senior teams.

History
The club was established in 2000 within the Perth amateur leagues. They were successful in 2014 with an application to play in the Football West State League Division 2 for the first time, and claimed the league title by going undefeated.

As well as its State League set up, the club partakes in the Sunday Amateur, Social and Masters divisions, while a Junior programme has been running since 2014.

After winning the league in the 2016 State League Division 1 it was announced that Joondalup would compete in the 2017 National Premier Leagues.

The club is an international partner of Celtic FC.

Current squad

Honours
 2011 Amateur Cup Winners
 2012 Amateur Premier League Winners
 2014 State League Division 2 Winners
 2015 State League Division 1 Reserves League Winners
 2016 State League Division 1 Winners
 2021 State League Division 1 Champions (Top four cup winner)

References

Soccer clubs in Perth, Western Australia
Football West State League teams
Association football clubs established in 1970
1970 establishments in Australia
National Premier Leagues clubs